Endowment may refer to:

Finance

Financial endowment, pertaining to funds or property donated to institutions or individuals (e.g., college endowment)
Endowment mortgage, a mortgage to be repaid by an endowment policy
Endowment policy, a type of life insurance policy
A synonym for budget constraint, the total funds available for spending

Economics
 Endowment effect, a cognitive bias 
 Endowment, a term used for land reclamation
 Endowment of natural or other resources that can become capital by the process of production

Other
 Endowment (philosophy); as a philosophical term
 Endowment (Latter Day Saints); a temple ceremony that confers heavenly priesthood power in Mormon theology
 Endowment (Mormonism)
 A term for when one person's traits are magically transferred to another in the Runelords saga